Saal is a studio album by American rapper Serengeti. It was released on Graveface Records in 2013. Entirely produced by Sicker Man, the album was recorded in Bonn, Germany. The title of the album comes from the German word for "room".

Critical reception

Mosi Reeves of Spin gave the album a 7 out of 10, saying, "Saal is an unexpectedly downbeat chapter in an increasingly impressive discography that will likely go unappreciated until years from now, when the world is better prepared for this Randy Newman-like bard and his ruminations on our mortal coil." Jonah Bromwich of Pitchfork gave the album a 6.3 out of 10, calling it "serious, overstated, and unavoidably heavy."

Impose included it on the "Best Albums of 2013" list.

Track listing

Personnel
Credits adapted from liner notes.

 Serengeti – vocals, zither, percussion
 Sicker Man – cello, guitar, synthesizer, analog effects, production
 Kiki Bohemia – additional vocals (1)
 Ryan McCardle – artwork, design, photography

References

External links
 

2013 albums
Serengeti (rapper) albums
Graveface Records albums